Kuhnhöfen is an Ortsgemeinde – a community belonging to a Verbandsgemeinde – in the Westerwaldkreis in Rhineland-Palatinate, Germany. It belongs to the Verbandsgemeinde of Wallmerod, a kind of collective municipality.

Geography

The community lies in the Westerwald in the Westerwald Lake Plateau drainage basin.

History
In 1590, Kuhnhöfen had its first documentary mention as Cunhoff uff der Steinen.

Politics

The municipal council is made up of 6 council members who were elected in a majority vote in a municipal election on 13 June 2004.

Economy and infrastructure

Right near the community runs Bundesstraße 8, linking Limburg an der Lahn and Hennef (Sieg). The nearest Autobahn interchange is Montabaur on the A 3 (Cologne–Frankfurt), some 11 km away. The nearest InterCityExpress stop is the railway station at Montabaur on the Cologne-Frankfurt high-speed rail line.

References

External links
 Kuhnhöfen 

Municipalities in Rhineland-Palatinate
Westerwaldkreis